The symbole, also called ar vuoc'h ("the cow"), was an object used by Francophone headmasters in public and private schools in Brittany, French Flanders, Occitania, Basque Country and North Catalonia as a means of punishment for students caught speaking Breton, Flemish, Occitan, Basque, or Catalan during the 19th and 20th centuries.

Generally, the student was supposed to pass the symbole onto another of his fellow students after catching him speaking Breton, Occitan or Catalan (referred to as patois). The student in possession of the object at the end of recess, the half-day, or the day would be punished with, for example, manual labor, extra homework, corporal punishment, or organized mockery led by the headmaster.

Nature of the object
The symbole could be:
 an ordinary wooden clog, sometimes not hollowed out, worn around the neck
 a slate worn around the neck. At the Plouaret public school from 1943 to 1949 students were required to write "je parle breton" ("I speak Breton") on the slate.
 an object to be carried in the pocket, such as a button, toy sabot, or badge.

The purpose of its use was:
 Exclusion of the targeted language (Breton, Occitan...) from school and play;
 Bringing mockery upon those who didn't follow the established language rules;
 to help bring detriment upon students and prevent student solidarity.

See also
 Welsh Not, in Wales
 Vergonha, in Occitania
 Dialect card, in Okinawa

Bibliography

References

Breton language
French language
History of Brittany
Language policy in France
Linguistic discrimination
Linguistic rights
Punishments
School punishments